Adrian O. Cambriani (birth registered first ¼ 1962) is a Welsh former rugby union, and professional rugby league footballer who played in the 1980s, and coached rugby union in the 2000s.

Background
Adrian Cambriani was born in Swansea, West Glamorgan, Wales.

Club career
Cambriani started his career as a rugby union player with Swansea RFC. In 1980, at the age of 18, he switched to rugby league, joining the newly formed Fulham for a signing-on fee of £16,000 (based on increases in average earnings, this would be approximately £90,210 in 2015). He made his début in Fulham's first league game, and became the club's first try scorer with two tries in a 24–5 victory over Wigan.

International honours
Cambriani won caps for Wales (RL) while at Fulham in 1981 3-caps.

References

External links
(archived by archive.is) League chaos as Penlan stripped of top spot
Team – Past Players – C at swansearfc.co.uk
Profile at swansearfc.co.uk

1962 births
Living people
Footballers who switched code
Hull F.C. players
London Broncos players
Rugby league players from Swansea
Rugby league wingers
Rugby union players from Swansea
Swansea RFC players
Wales national rugby league team players
Welsh rugby league players
Welsh rugby union coaches
Welsh rugby union players